John Mackin (18 November 1943 – 29 July 2022) was a Scottish professional footballer and manager.

Career
Born in Bellshill, North Lanarkshire, Mackin played for Northampton Town, Lincoln City, York City and Darlington in the Football League. He was appointed player-manager of Corby Town in July 1973. Mackin died in July 2022 aged 78.

References

1943 births
2022 deaths
Footballers from Bellshill
Scottish footballers
Association football defenders
Northampton Town F.C. players
Lincoln City F.C. players
York City F.C. players
Darlington F.C. players
Corby Town F.C. players
English Football League players
Scottish football managers
Corby Town F.C. managers